John Campbell, 2nd Marquess of Breadalbane,  (26 October 1796 – 8 November 1862), styled Lord Glenorchy until 1831 and as Earl of Ormelie from 1831 to 1834, was a Scottish nobleman and Liberal politician.

Background and education

Born at Dundee, Angus, Breadalbane was the son of Lieutenant-General John Campbell, 1st Marquess of Breadalbane, and Mary, daughter of David Gavin. He was educated at Eton.

Political career

Breadalbane sat as Member of Parliament for Okehampton from 1820 to 1826 and for Perthshire from 1832 to 1834. The latter year he succeeded his father as second Marquess of Breadalbane and entered the House of Lords. In 1848 he was sworn of the Privy Council and appointed Lord Chamberlain of the Household by Lord John Russell, a post he held until the government fell in 1852. He held the same office under Lord Aberdeen between 1853 and 1855 and under Lord Palmerston between 1855 and 1858.

Other public appointments
A freemason, Breadalbane was Grand Master of the Grand Lodge of Scotland between 1824 and 1826. He was elected a Fellow of the Royal Society in 1834 and made a Knight of the Thistle in 1838. The following year he was appointed Lord Lieutenant of Argyllshire, a post he held until his death. In 1842 he entertained Queen Victoria and the Prince Consort at Taymouth Castle.

He was a supporter of the Free Church of Scotland during the Disruption of 1843.

Breadalbane was also Rector of the University of Glasgow between 1840 and 1842 and of Marischal College, Aberdeen, between 1843 and 1845, President of the Society of Antiquaries between 1844 and 1862 and Governor of the Bank of Scotland between 1861 and 1862. In 1861 he was sent on a special diplomatic mission to Berlin for the investiture of King William I in the Order of the Garter. He was appointed a Knight of the Order of the Black Eagle of Prussia at the same time.

Personal life
Lord Breadalbane married Lady Elizabeth ("Eliza"), daughter of George Baillie and sister of George Baillie-Hamilton, 10th Earl of Haddington, in 1821. They had no children. She was a Lady of the Bedchamber to Queen Victoria. She died in Mayfair, London, on 28 August 1861, aged 58. Lord Breadalbane survived her by just over a year and died at Lausanne, Switzerland, on 8 November 1862, aged 66. On his death the barony of Breadalbane, earldom of Ormelie and marquessate of Breadalbane became extinct. He was succeeded in the lordship of Glenorchy, viscountcy of Tay and Paintland and earldom of Breadalbane and Holland by his distant relative and namesake, John Campbell. The marquessate was revived in favour of the latter's son in 1885.

Lord Breadalbane's sister Mary Campbell married Richard Temple-Nugent-Brydges-Chandos-Grenville, 2nd Duke of Buckingham and Chandos in 1819, with Richard inheriting the Dukedom in 1839.  Breadalbane's and Mary's father the 1st Marquess was a trustee of a marriage settlement made for the union at the time of the wedding. 

Included in the settlement, was an interest in the Hope Plantation in St. Andrew, Jamaica, which had come down from Anne the Duchess of Chandos, the wife of the 3rd Duke of Chandos from the previous century.    In the aftermath of the Slavery Abolition Act 1833 with the Slave Compensation Act 1837, Mary's father-in-law, the 1st Duke of Buckingham and Chandos made a claim for compensation, "T71/865 St Andrew claim no. 114", comprising 379 slaves in Jamaica. The claim was denied, as the ownership was determined to be part of the marriage settlement, but a £6,630 payment was awarded to the 1st Marquess of Breadalbane and Hon. George Neville Grenville as joint Trustees, at the time (worth £ in ). However, the papers note that the 1st Marquess had passed away in 1834, two years before the award was made, and so it is concluded that the 2nd Marquess was the awardee, though it is possible that the identity of the trustee was confused.  However executed, the beneficiary of the payment was the 2nd Marquess' nephew, the 2nd Duke of Buckingham and Chandos, when the latter came into his inheritance.

References

Citations

Sources

External links 
 

1796 births
1862 deaths
Members of the Privy Council of the United Kingdom
Glenorchy, John Campbell, Lord
Ormelie, John Campbell, Earl of
John Campbell, 2nd Marquess of Breadalbane
Fellows of the Royal Society
Fellows of the Society of Antiquaries of London
Governors of the Bank of Scotland
Knights of the Thistle
Lord-Lieutenants of Argyllshire
People educated at Eton College
Rectors of the University of Aberdeen
Rectors of the University of Glasgow
Glenorchy, John Campbell, Lord
Ormelie, John Campbell, Earl of
UK MPs who inherited peerages
Whig (British political party) MPs for English constituencies
Whig (British political party) MPs for Scottish constituencies
Politicians from Dundee
John
Recipients of payments from the Slavery Abolition Act 1833
Scottish slave owners
19th-century British businesspeople